Edgemere is a neighborhood in the New York City borough of Queens, extending from Beach 32nd to Beach 52nd Street on the Rockaway Peninsula. It contains Rockaway Community Park. Arverne is to the west, and Far Rockaway to the east. Edgemere was founded in 1892 by Frederick J. Lancaster, who originally called it New Venice.

Edgemere is located in Queens Community District 14 and its ZIP Code is 11691. It is patrolled by the New York City Police Department's 101st Precinct.

References

External links

Neighborhoods in Queens, New York
Neighborhoods in Rockaway, Queens
Populated places established in 1892
Populated coastal places in New York (state)
1892 establishments in New York (state)